Diosdado Aenlle Talamayan,  (born October 19, 1932) is a Filipino prelate of the Catholic Church. He served as the archbishop of the Archdiocese of Tuguegarao in the province of Cagayan, on the island of Luzon, Philippines from 1986 until his retirement in 2011. In retirement, Talamayan is archbishop emeritus of Tuguegarao.

Early life and studies
Diosdado Aenlle Talamayan was born October 19, 1932. He graduated from the Pontifical and Royal University of Sto Tomas, Manila in 1953. He received his Diploma in French Language and Civilization at the Institute Catholique in France in 1960. He then studied at the Pontifical University of Salamanca, Spain until 1961.  He received his Doctor of Philosophy at the Universidad Central de Madrid, Spain in 1962. He received his MA in Teacher Education in 1970 at Columbia University.  He also had his Diploma in Thesis Advising from the De La Salle University, Manila in 1979. He is fluent in speaking his Tagalog, as well as the English, Spanish and French languages.

Ministry
Talamayan was ordained priest on November 30, 1956, in Manila, the Philippines. He was an instructor at the San Jacinto Seminary in Alimanao, Peñablanca, Cagayan from 1957 to 1959.  He then became the President of Lyceum of Aparri from 1967 to 1968.  He became the episcopal vicar of Aparri, Cagayan from 1971 to 1986. He was appointed an auxiliary bishop of Tuguegarao and Titular Bishop of Girus on October 20, 1983. On January 12, 1984, He was consecrated bishop by then Apostolic Nuncio to the Philippines, Archbishop Bruno Torpigliani at the Saint Peter Metropolitan Cathedral.  Later, he was appointed as the second Archbishop of Tuguegarao on January 31, 1986, succeeding Archbishop Teodulfo Domingo.

Before his episcopal ordination, Talamayan founded on February 11, 1967, the Lyceum of Aparri, the mother school of the Archdiocese of Tuguegarao and the Thomas Aquinas Major Seminary (TAMS). In the field of culture and heritage, he established the Cagayan Ecclesiastical Museum which is located within the Lyceum of Aparri campus in 1967. He also founded the Our Lady of Piat Museum at the Minor Basilica of Our Lady of Piat. During his episcopacy, a more permanent structure for the Archdiocesan Archives was built and inaugurated. All these while tirelessly working to preserve and promote Cagayan culture and heritage. Archbishop Talamayan also founded the order of Eucharistic Healers of Mary whose charism was to take care of sick and elderly priests. Fr. Lorenzo Marzo is the first ordained priest.

Talamayan was the chairman of the Commission on Health Care of the Catholic Bishops' Conference of the Philippines (CBCP) in 1987.

During Talamayan's 75th birthday on October 19, Philippines President Gloria Arroyo inaugurated the carillon bells at the Sto. Nino Prish and Shrine, San Gabriel, Tuguegarao City, an added attraction in the region being the first and only bell system in Cagayan Valley. The birthday celebration also marked the end of his tenure as pastor of the entire archdiocese, with the dioceses of Ilagan and Bayombong covering the provinces of Isabela, and Nueva Vizcaya and Quirino, respectively.

See also
 Current Filipino Archbishops

References

External links
Diosdado A. Talamayan CBCP
Catholic Hierarchy Diosdado A. Talamayan
Archdiocese of Tuguegarao
PGMA greets her archbishop ally and friend on his 75th birthday
Tuguegarao has carillon as attraction for region

Living people
1932 births
20th-century Roman Catholic archbishops in the Philippines
21st-century Roman Catholic archbishops in the Philippines
Complutense University of Madrid alumni
De La Salle University alumni
Pontifical University of Salamanca alumni
Roman Catholic archbishops of Tuguegarao
Teachers College, Columbia University alumni
University of Santo Tomas alumni